The present coat of arms of Sarawak is largely based on the second state coat of arms, which was granted on 31 August 1973.

Current coat of arms of Sarawak 
The current coat of arms was established on 31 August 1988. The shield features a symbolic wing-spread Kenyalang or rhinoceros hornbill with the shield bearing the state flag. The hornbill's wings have 13 feathers, which represent the states in Malaysia. The Hibiscus represent the Malaysia's national flower which appears on the right and left sides of the bird's legs and the hornbill perches a banner bearing the words "Bersatu, Berusaha, Berbakti" which means 'Unity, Effort, Service'.

Past coat of arms

City, district and municipal coat of arms

See also
 Flag of Sarawak
 Armorial of Malaysia

References 

Sarawak
Sarawak
Sarawak
Sarawak
Sarawak